Sinarka is a stratovolcano located at the northern end of Shiashkotan Island, Kuril Islands, Russia. Most eruptions occurred during the 17th and 18th centuries, although there has been some recent activity, mostly steam and thermal activity. A large eruption would not affect large populations; only three people are located within 10 km. The main structure of the volcano consists of the main peak, and two sub-peaks with a mellow ridge descending to the southwest. The larger sub-peak could be considered its own peak, due to its  of prominence.

See also
 List of volcanoes in Russia

Notes

Shiashkotan
Stratovolcanoes of Russia
Volcanoes of the Kuril Islands
Holocene stratovolcanoes